Corpoyer-la-Chapelle is a village and a commune in the Côte-d'Or department in Burgundy in eastern France.

Population

See also
Communes of the Côte-d'Or department

References

Communes of Côte-d'Or